Thomas John McDonnell, D.D., (August 18, 1894 – February 25, 1961) was the Roman Catholic coadjutor bishop, cum jure successionis, of what is now the Roman Catholic Diocese of Wheeling-Charleston, West Virginia.

Education and pastoral assignment
Thomas John McDonnell was born in New York City. He was ordained to the priesthood for the Roman Catholic Archdiocese of New York on September 20, 1919. Early in his career, on October 30, 1921, he sang the Solemn High Mass dedicating Staten Island's new Mission Church of St. Clare, where he served as Assistant Rector. McDonnell was admitted as an affiliated member, number 87, to Marist College in 1944.

Episcopacy
On July 2, 1947, Pope Pius XII appointed McDonnell auxiliary bishop of the New York Archdiocese. He was consecrated on September 15, 1947, taking as his episcopal motto: "Ad Jesum Per Mariam" (To Jesus Through Mary). His principal consecrator was Cardinal Francis Spellman, and the principal co-consecrators were Cardinals Richard James Cushing and James Francis Aloysius McIntyre. On March 7, 1951, Pope Pius XII appointed McDonnell to the Wheeling Diocese, with the right to succeed Bishop John Joseph Swint.

Prominent Masses in New York
On March 17, 1948, McDonnell celebrated a Pontifical High Mass in honor of St. Patrick with Spellman presiding. This High Mass was said for St. Patrick's Cathedral's patron saint with 3,000 parishioners in attendance and was covered in The New York Times.

On June 6, 1948, McDonnell presided at a solemn Pontifical Mass celebrating the golden jubilee of Monsignor John J. E. O'Brien, who was the pastor of St. Agnes Church (New York City).

Consecrations and dedications
On October 24, 1953, McDonnell consecrated Marist College's altar with the relics of two martyrs, Saints Urban and Felician, in Our Lady Seat of Wisdom Chapel.

On May 16, 1954, All Saints Catholic Church was dedicated by McDonnell in Bridgeport, West Virginia.

McDonnell dedicated Sacred Heart Catholic Church in Williamson, West Virginia on May 27, 1951, and its school on December 15, 1957.

McDonnell was the principal consecrator of Bishop Patrick Joseph Byrne. He was the principal co-consecrator of Bishops Augustine Francis Wildermuth, Stephen Anthony Appelhans, John Joseph Boardman, Richard Henry Ackerman and Archbishop Leo Clement Andrew Arkfeld.

Death
McDonnell died of an acute viral infection on February 25, 1961, before he was able to succeed Swint to become bishop of Wheeling. McDonnell had been a priest for 41 years and a bishop for 13 years. Swint died the following year, on November 23, 1962.

References

1894 births
1961 deaths
Clergy from New York City
Marist College alumni
20th-century Roman Catholic bishops in the United States
Roman Catholic Diocese of Wheeling-Charleston
Religious leaders from West Virginia